Lo Ka Chun born 11 November in Hong Kong, China is best known as a race driver.

Racing extensively throughout Asia he has won the Asian Touring Car Championship and Chinese Touring Car Championship during his career. He also won the Macau Cup race five times from 2001–2004 and will race in the World Touring Car Championship at Macau in 2011. His car failed scrutineering and was excluded from the event.

Statistics

Motor racing record

Complete World Touring Car Championship results
(key) (Races in bold indicate pole position) (Races in italics indicate fastest lap)

References

External links 
 WTCC Driver profile
 Team 778 Driver profile (Chinese)

1977 births
Living people
Hong Kong people
Hong Kong racing drivers
World Touring Car Championship drivers